The fourth season of  the Syfy reality television series Face Off premiered on January 15, 2013 and ended March 26, 2013. The season featured 14 prosthetic makeup artists competing against each other to create makeup effects. Anthony Kosar of Chicago, Illinois, was the winner of the season. The grand prize for the fourth season was a position as a guest lecturer at the Make Up For Ever Academies in New York and Paris, a 2013 Fiat 500, and $100,000.

The finals venue for this season was Wynn in Paradise, Nevada.

Judges
Ve Neill
Glenn Hetrick
Neville Page
Michael Westmore (mentor)
McKenzie Westmore (hostess)

Contestants

Production
Syfy picked up Face Off for a fourth season on October 9, 2012, which premiered on January 15, 2013 after the third season became one of the network's highest rated programs along with its strong performance. A sneak peek of the upcoming season premiered during the live season 3 finale.  Season 4 was the first season to create full on creature suites.  Large fabrications and massive sculpting designs with crazy out of the box thinking.

Guests slated to appear are Bryan Singer, John Rhys-Davies, Jon Landau, Michael Nankin and Gale Anne Hurd, who previously served as a guest judge in season 3. McKenzie Westmore's father Michael Westmore joins this season as a mentor.

Contestant progress

 The contestant won Face Off.
  The contestant was a runner-up.
 The contestant won a Spotlight Challenge.
 The contestant won a Spotlight Challenge by default.
 The contestant was part of a team that won the Spotlight Challenge.
 The contestant was in the top in the Spotlight Challenge.
 The contestant was deemed the best in the Spotlight Challenge but was not eligible for the win due to not completing the challenge.
 The contestant was in the bottom in the Spotlight Challenge.
 The contestant was a teammate of the eliminated contestant in the Spotlight Challenge.
 The contestant was eliminated.
 ‡ The contestant won the Foundation Challenge.

Episodes

{| class="wikitable plainrowheaders" style="width:100%; margin:auto;"
|-
|-style="color:white"
! scope="col" style="background-color: #fce6b5; width:12em; color:#000000;" |No. inseries
! scope="col" style="background-color: #fce6b5; width:12em; color:#000000;" |No. inseason
! scope="col" style="background-color: #fce6b5; width:12em; color:#000000;" |Title  
! scope="col" style="background-color: #fce6b5; width:12em; color:#000000;" |Original air date 
! scope="col" style="background-color: #fce6b5; width:12em; color:#000000;" |U.S. viewers(million)
! scope="col" style="background-color: #fce6b5; width:12em; color:#000000;" |18-49Rating
 
  
 
 
 
 
 
  
 
 
 
|}

Face Off Redemption
Face Off Redemption is a web miniseries hosted by judge Glenn Hetrick in conjunction with season 4. It puts the eliminated artists against each other with the winner getting a spot in Face Offs upcoming fifth season. This show reveals that Face Off will have a 5th season.

Webisode 1
Artists Troy, Alex, Michael, and Katie must each create an alien emissary.
Winner: Katie

Webisode 2
Artists Katie, Jenna, Alam, and Autumn must each create a glam rock vampire.
Winner: Jenna

Webisode 3
Artists Jenna, Meagan, and Eric Z. must each create a nightmare clown.
Winner: Eric Z.

Webisode 4
In the final redemption challenge, artists Eric Z., Eric F., and House must each create an original mutant.
Winner: Eric Z
.

References

External links
 
 

2013 American television seasons
Face Off (TV series)